Albert Foday (born April 27, 1985) nickname Junnior Biano is a Sierra Leonean  international footballer who is an attacking midfielder and is currently playing for FC Kallon, one of the top clubs in the Sierra Leone National Premier League.

He is known in Sierra Leone for being a free kick expert. In a 2007 CAF Champions League qualifier he scored a free kick against top Nigerian club Ocean Boys F.C., thereby knocking the Nigerian Champions out of the competition. He also went on to score again this time against ASEC Mimosas with another free kick opening the scoring in Abidjan but FC Kallon went on to lose the match 2–1 and 3–1 on aggregate.

External links

Sierra Leonean footballers
Living people
1985 births
Association football midfielders
Sportspeople from Freetown
Sierra Leone international footballers